Rohan Hancock (born 18 June 1955 in Toowoomba, Queensland) is an Australian former rugby league footballer who played in the 1970s and 1980s. An Australian international and Queensland representative prop forward, he played his club football in Queensland with Toowoomba.

Biography
Hancock, a prop from Toowoomba, first represented Queensland in 1978, played against Great Britain in 1979 before touring New Zealand with Australia the following year. Hancock played in the inaugural State of Origin match in 1980 but had to wait another two years before making his Test debut.

After playing in two Tests against NZ, Hancock was selected with the Kangaroos and made his only Test appearance against Papua New Guinea (in 1982) on the way to England and France with the 1982 Invincibles. He played in nine other matches on tour.

Personal life 
Rohan Hancock's  daughter, Steph Hancock, is captain of the Australian Jillaroos.

External links
Queensland representatives at qrl.com.au

1955 births
Living people
Queensland Rugby League State of Origin players
Australia national rugby league team players
Australian rugby league players
Rugby league players from Toowoomba
Rugby league props